El fin de la noche is a 1944 Argentine film. It is notable for being an anti-Nazi film made in neutral Argentina during World War II and set in occupied France. Shot from August to November 1943 in Cordoba Province, the release was put on hold for more than a year, pending authorization by the pro-Axis military government of that time. The film is also remembered in Argentina for Libertad Lamarque's performance of the tango Uno, composed by Mariano Mores and Enrique Santos Discépolo.

Plot
A female Argentine tango singer in occupied France (Libertad Lamarque) gets romantically involved with a Resistance member (Juan José Miguez). A local Gestapo commander (Alberto Bello) tries to convince her to infiltrate the Resistance in exchange for her little daughter's safety.

Cast
Libertad Lamarque...Lola Morel
Juan José Míguez...Daniel
Alberto Bello...Herr Kleit
María Esther Buschiazzo …Madame Gené
Ernesto Raquén …Jaime
Florence Marly...Agent "Pilar"
Homero Cárpena...Resistance's driver
Rene Mugica...Kleit's assistant

Notes

External links
 El fin de la noche (1944) At the Internet Movie Database
 1944 - El Fin de la Noche 
  

1944 films
1940s Spanish-language films
Argentine black-and-white films
Films about the French Resistance
World War II films made in wartime
Tango films
Films directed by Alberto de Zavalía
War romance films
Argentine war films
1940s war films
1940s Argentine films